Cyphocardamum is a genus of flowering plants belonging to the family Brassicaceae.

Its native range is Afghanistan.

Species:
 Cyphocardamum aretioides Hedge

References

Brassicaceae
Brassicaceae genera